The Lifetime Achievement Award is an award given each year at the World Soundtrack Awards. Like other awards at other award academies, this award recognizes lifetime dedication and excellence in a specific field, in this case TV and film score (and sometimes just music in general). It has been given to at least one person each year since the Awards' debut in 2001.

Recipients

References
World Soundtrack Awards at IMDb

External links
 

World Soundtrack Awards
Lifetime achievement awards